This is a list of St Aloysius' College Alumni. Notable former studentsknown as "Old Boys"of the Catholic school, St Aloysius' College in Milsons Point, New South Wales, Australia.

Academia, medicine and science

 Dr Walter Burfitt  a surgeon and co-founder of the Royal Australasian College of Surgeons; a founder of the Medical Benevolent Association of New South Wales (also attended Saint Ignatius' College, Riverview)
Dr Stephen Hicks a research fellow in Neuroscience and Visual Prosthetics, Nuffield Department of Clinical Neurosciences, University of Oxford
Professor Jacques Miller   (1931- ) a distinguished research scientist
Sir Gustav Nossal  (1931- ) a distinguished research scientist; a former director of the Walter and Eliza Hall Institute of Medical Research (1965-1996); and 2000 Australian of the Year

Business

David Murray  a former Chairman of the Australian Government Future Fund and a former CEO of the Commonwealth Bank
 Danny Kennedy environmentalist, clean-tech entrepreneur and founder of Sungevity
 Andrew Low a corporate adviser, and CEO RedBridge Grant Samuel

Clergy

Right Reverend Joseph DwyerBishop of Wagga Wagga 1918-1939 (also attended St Patrick's College, Goulburn)
Bishop Gregory Homeming - Bishop of Lismore
Peter L'EstrangeRector of Newman College (University of Melbourne) 1991-2006 and Master of Campion Hall, Oxford since 2006
Archbishop Eris O'BrienAuxiliary Bishop of Sydney 1948–1951, Archbishop of Canberra and Goulburn 1953-1966
Bishop William WrightBishop of Maitland-Newcastle

Media, entertainment and the arts

 
Christopher Brennana poet and Scholar (also attended Saint Ignatius' College, Riverview)
Don Burke television presenter, television producer, author and horticulturalist 
Danny Claytona television presenter and media personality, best known for his work as a Channel V Australia VJ
Martin Cookea baritone with the Bavarian State Opera
Alex Cubis - actor and lawyer
John Bede Dalleya journalist and writer (also attended St Augustine's Abbey school and Beaumont College)
Anh Doa comedian, painter and actor (Footy Legends, Thank God You're Here, SBS series Kick, Runner up on Dancing with the Stars (Series 7), Dancing with the Deals)
Khoa Dothe 2005 Young Australian of the Year, screenwriter and director of Footy Legends
Sir Charles Mackerrasa conductor and brother of Alistair and Malcolm (also attended Sydney Grammar School)
Julian Morrowa journalist, comedian and writer, best known for The Chaser, CNNNN, The Chaser's War on Everything
Melvyn Morrowa playwright whose musical scores included Shout! The Legend of The Wild One and Dusty - The Musical; and an English teacher
Matthew Reillyan author whose novels include Ice Station, Area 7, Scarecrow, Hover Car Racer, Seven Ancient Wonders and Contest
Cyril Ritcharda broadway Actor
Justin Smithan actor who starred in Billy Elliot the Musical in Australia
Adam Spencera mathematician, comedian and radio host
Tom Switzereditor of the Australian version of The Spectator and research associate at the United States Studies Centre, University of Sydney
Tom Williamsa television presenter (The Great Outdoors); reporter and star of Dancing With the Stars

Politics, public service and the law

Tony Abbott  a former Australian Prime Minister, a former member of the Australian House of Representatives who represented Warringah for the Liberal Party, and a former minister in the Howard government; (left after graduation from the junior school to attend Saint Ignatius' College, Riverview)
Robert Broinowski a public servant and poet; Clerk of the Australian Senate (1939–1942)
Sir Maurice Byers Solicitor-General of Australia during the Australian constitutional crisis of 1975
Joseph Farrar Coates a Member of the New South Wales Legislative Council and a minister in the Lang and Stevens governments (1921–1943)
Francis Joseph Finnan  a Member of the New South Wales Legislative Assembly representing Hawkesbury and Darlinghurst for Labor; and later a public servant
Nick Greiner  a former chairman of Infrastructure NSW; the 37th Premier of New South Wales (1988–1992); and a Member of the Legislative Assembly representing Ku-ring-gai for the Liberal Party (1980–1992) (also attended Saint Ignatius' College, Riverview).
Joe Hockey  the current Australian Ambassador to the United States and a former Member of the Australian House of Representatives, representing North Sydney for the Liberal Party; a former minister in the Howard Government, in the Abbott Government Hockey served as Treasurer of Australia
Francis Keane a public servant and magistrate
John Kearney  a Justice of the Supreme Court of New South Wales and president of the NSW Bar Association 
 John Ormond Kennedy MP, Member of Victorian Legislative Assembly representing Hawthorn for the Labor Party since November 2018
Michael L'Estrange   a former Secretary of the Department of Foreign Affairs and Trade; a former Australian High Commissioner to the United Kingdom; a former Secretary to Cabinet; and Rhodes Scholar
Malcolm Mackerras  a psephologist and creator of the 'Mackerras Electoral Pendulum'; and brother of Charles (also attended Sydney Grammar School)
Dick Meagher  a former Speaker, and a former Member of the New South Wales Legislative Assembly representing Sydney-Phillip, then Tweed and then Phillip, variously for Labor and as an independent representative between 1895 and 1917; and a former Lord Mayor of Sydney (1895–1920) (also attended St Stanislaus' College)
Jonathan O'Dea   a Member of the New South Wales Legislative Assembly representing Davidson for the Liberal Party since 2007 (also attended Saint Ignatius' College, Riverview)
Professor Tim Stephens a professor of International Law, Australian Research Council Future Fellow, Sydney Law School, University of Sydney

Sport

Bernard FoleyWaratahs and Wallabies rugby player
Cecil Healya winner of individual silver and team gold medals in swimming at the 1912 Olympic Games
Ater Majoka basketball player, selected by the Los Angeles Lakers in the 2011 NBA Draft
Dr Herbert MoranWallabies captain (1908) (also attended St. Joseph's College, Hunters Hill)
Pat McCabeBrumbies and Wallabies rugby player

See also
 List of non-government schools in New South Wales
Combined Associated Schools

References

External links
 St Aloysius' College website

St Aloysius
St Aloysius